State Road 312 in the U.S. state of Indiana is an east–west state highway in the northwestern part of the state.

Route description

SR 312 heads east from White Oak Avenue next to the Bishop Noll Institute and enters a mostly commercial area, having an intersection with U.S. Route 20 (US 20). The highway crosses over the Indiana Ship Canal and passes between industrial properties. SR 312 eastern terminus is at an interchange with US 12 and SR 912. Chicago Avenue continues east of US 12 and SR 912 as a short street, passing through more industrial properties before dead-ending at a railroad.

No part of SR 312 is included as a part of the National Highway System (NHS).  The NHS is a network of highways that are identified as being most important for the economy, mobility and defense of the nation.  The highway is maintained by the Indiana Department of Transportation (INDOT) like all other state roads in the state. The department tracks the traffic volumes along all state highways as a part of its maintenance responsibilities using a metric called average annual daily traffic (AADT). This measurement is a calculation of the traffic level along a segment of roadway for any average day of the year. In 2010, INDOT figured that lowest traffic levels were the 5,400 vehicles and 260 commercial vehicles used the highway daily on a section that is concurrent with Sheffield Avenue. The peak traffic volumes were 15,310 vehicles and 1,090 commercial vehicles AADT along a section of SR 312 between the Indiana Toll Road and US 20.

Major intersections

References

External links

Northwest Indiana
312
Transportation in Lake County, Indiana